"Psychofreak" (stylized in all lowercase) is a song by Cuban-American singer Camila Cabello, featuring vocals from fellow American singer-songwriter Willow. It was released through Epic Records as the third single from Cabello's third studio album, Familia, on April 8, 2022, alongside the album.

Background
"Psychofreak" is based on Cabello's anxiety. Cabello said that one line in the song "I don't blame the girls for how it went down" was about her leaving American girl group Fifth Harmony. The song refers to her previous relationship with ex-partner Shawn Mendes.

Critical reception
AllMusic wrote that "Psychofreak" sounds like '90s trip-hop". Nick Levine of NME felt that the song "proves it's still possible to write a smart and original song about mental health in 2022".

Rolling Stone reviewed the song, saying "Camila Cabello wears her heart on her sleeve and faces the scar tissue of her past on 'Psycho Freak.' The Familia track, which features haunting vocals from Willow, paints a picture of the Cuban-Mexican singer’s anxiety as she shares her truth in a vulnerable way."

Commercial performance 
"Psychofreak" peaked at number seventy-five on the Billboard Hot 100, marking Cabello's milestone twentieth entry on the chart. It peaked at number fifty on the Billboard Global 200, Cabello's 6th entry.

The song peaked at number seventy-three on the UK singles chart.

Live performances
"Psychofreak" received its debut performance on TikTok's Familia: Welcome to the Family concert on April 7, 2022, alongside performances of the rest of the album's songs. The song was performed by Cabello and Willow together on Saturday Night Live on April 9, 2022.

Cabello performed "Psychofreak" during her festival appearances at Wango Tango and WAZMATAZZ on June 4 and 5 respectively.

Charts

References

2022 singles
2022 songs
Camila Cabello songs
Willow Smith songs
Songs written by Camila Cabello
Songs written by Willow Smith
Songs written by Scott Harris (songwriter)
Songs written by Ricky Reed
Songs about diseases and disorders
Epic Records singles
Trip hop songs